The Syrian Turkmen Group was an early opposition movement of Syrian Turkmens. Founded in 2011 by prominent Syrian Turkmens and 180 Syrian Turkmen in Turkey, it was led by Bekir Atacan. In late 2011, it joined forces with the preexisting Syrian Turkmen Movement to form the larger Syria Turkmen Bloc, which was officially established in February 2012.

Amidst the merger phase, they however suffered a split, with both leaders of the constituent organizations, the 's Bekir Atacan and the 's Ali Öztürkmen, leaving to launch yet another activism-based movement, the Syrian Democratic Turkmen Movement.

References

Bibliography

2011 establishments in Turkey
2012 disestablishments in Turkey
Defunct political parties in Syria
Political parties disestablished in 2012
Political parties established in 2011
Political parties of minorities in Syria
Syrian National Council
Syrian Turkmen organizations